Vicki (Due) Hendricks is an American author of crime fiction, erotica, and a variety of short stories.

Background
Hendricks was born in Covington, Kentucky, raised in Cincinnati, Ohio, and moved to Florida in 1973. She earned a B.S. in English education from Ohio State University in 1973, an M.A. in English from Florida Atlantic University in 1979, and an M.F.A. in creative writing from Florida International University in 1992. Hendricks' novel Cruel Poetry was a finalist for the Edgar Award in 2008. Her work has been translated into Italian, German, French, Finnish, Hebrew, Spanish, Portuguese, Dutch, Korean, Japanese and Chinese. As a professor of English, she has taught at Broward College in Hollywood, Florida, since 1981.

Hendricks has been praised as the "Queen of Noir"  for rejuvenating women's crime/noir in the nineties and both extolled and denounced for her graphic use of sexual elements that distinguish neo-noir from noir of the 1930s through 1950s. Her novels have been reviewed in The New York Times Review of Books, Publishers Weekly, Kirkus Reviews, and the American Library Association's Booklist, as well as newspapers, blogs, and review sites.

Bibliography

Novels
Miami Purity (200 pages, hardback, Pantheon Books, 1995, paperback; reprint: Busted Flush Press, 2007)
Iguana Love (185 pages, hardback, Serpent's Tail, 1999)
Voluntary Madness (215 pages, hardback, Serpent's Tail, 2000, paperback, Serpent's Tail, 2002)
Sky Blues (230 pages, hardback, St. Martin's Press, 2002, paperback, Serpent's Tail, 2002)
Cruel Poetry (312 pages, paperback, Serpent's Tail, 2007)
Fur People (286 pages, paperback, Winona Woods, 2013)

Collection
Florida Gothic Stories (228 pages, paperback, Kitsune Books, 2010)

Short stories, excerpts, chapters
"Dance of the Manatee." Chapter 10. Naked Came the Manatee. Ed. Tom Shroder. Putnam, 1997.
Excerpt from Iguana Love. Zing. Ed. Brian Antoni. July, 1997.
"West End." Murder for Revenge. Ed. Otto Penzler. Delacorte, 1998.
"Penile Infraction." Dick for a Day. Ed. Fiona Giles. Villard, 1997; Having a Wonderful Time. Ed. John Dufresne. Simon & Schuster, 1998.
"The Perfect Couple." Miami Metro, 1998.
"ReBecca." Nerve.com. Ed. Genevieve Fields 1998; Best American Erotica 2000. Ed. Susie Bright. Scribner's; Vox and Voice, UK, 1999;  Sweet and Vicious CD. Read by Parker Posey. Nerve Studios Productions, 1999.
"Tender Fruit." The Mammoth Book of Erotica. Ed. Maxim Jacubowski. Thunder's Mouth. UK, 2000.
Excerpt from Miami Purity. Le Livre du Plaisir. Ed. Catherine Breche. France, Jan, 2000.
"Gators." Mississippi Review. Noir Issue. Ed. Anthony Neil Smith, 2000; Flesh and Blood. Ed. Max Allan Collins and Jeff Gelb. Warner Books, 2001; Mississippi Review: "Best of" Issue. Ed. Frederick Barthelme. Vol 9, #4. Fall, 2003.
"Alligatoren." ("Gators.") German trans. Die 7 Todsünden, Heyne Verlag, Germany, 2002.
"Stormy, Mon Amour." Tart Noir. Eds. Lauren Henderson and Stella Duffy. Berkeley Books, 2002; Gulf Stream. Florida International University. #22, 2004.
"Must Bite." Dying for It: Tales of Sex and Death. Ed. Mitzi Szereto. Thunder's Mouth Press, 2006; Susie Bright's Erotic Treasury, 2008.
"Purrz, Baby." Mississippi Review: High Pulp. Ed. Anthony Neil Smith. 2005; Deadly Housewives. Ed. Christine Matthews. HarperCollins, 2006.
"Boozanne, Lemme Be." Miami Noir. Ed. Les Standiford. Akashic Press, 2006; Men Undressed: Women Writers on the Male Sexual Experience. Eds. Stacy Bierlein, Gina Frangello, Cris Mazza and Kat Meads. OV Press, 2011.
"West End." Finnish trans. Isku Jannityskertomuksia, No 4, 2006.
"Chapter Eleven." American Casanova : The New Adventures of the Legendary Lover. Ed. Maxim Jacubowski. Thunder's Mouth, 2006.
"The Big O." A Hell of a Woman: An Anthology of Female Noir. Ed. Megan Abbott. Busted Flush Press, 2007.
"Be Very Afraid." Getting Even: Revenge Stories. Ed. Mitzi Szereto. Serpent's Tail, 2007.
"Sinny and the Prince: A Fairy Tale." Murdaland. Ed. Michael Langnas. Mug Shot Press, 2007.
"Sweet Dreams." Gulf Stream. Ed. Joe Clifford. Florida International University, 2008.
"Woodster." Drinking with Papa Legba. Ed. Lee Anderson. 2011.
"Purrz, Baby." Beat to a Pulp II. Ed. David Cranmer. 2012.

Non-fiction
"Freshwater Diving Delight." Gold Coast Life. May, 1983, 56–57.
"Last Call for Lobster." Gold Coast Life. February, 1984, 60–61+
"Miami's Metrozoo." Florida's Goldcoast. December, 1984.
"Felix Mas." Florida's Goldcoast. March, 1985, 33–35.
"Leadership and The One-Minute Manager." Florida's Goldcoast. September 1985, 31–32.
"In Search of Buffalo Wings." Boca Raton. Summer, 1987, 132.
"The Line of the Sun: Analysis of Judith Ortiz Cofer's Novel." Masterplots II: Women in Literature. Salem Press. 1995, 1309–1313.
"Wrestling Hemingway: Imitating Author's Life Brings Novel Inspiration." Miami Herald. July 18, 1999.
"Four Dog Nights: Dogsledding in Finland." Fort Lauderdale Sun-Sentinel. December 31, 2000.
"Dying to Dive." The Observer Sport Monthly. September, 2002.
"Out in the Blue: The Adventures of Skydiving and Writing." Crimespree Magazine. # 3, Oct-Nov, 2004.
"The Ketchup-Lid Skirt." Desire: Women Write About Wanting. Seal Press, 2007.

Interviews
"Vicki Hendricks" Interrogations. Jon Jordan. Mystery One Books, 2003.
"Sex and Dolphins in the Sunshine State: An Interview with Vicki Hendricks"  Gulf Stream. Melanie Neal. Florida International University, Vol 22, 2004.
"Hollywood Beach: Body Heat" Back to the Badlands. John Williams, Serpent's Tail, 2007.
"Vicki Hendricks: South Florida Noir Specialist." Ellen Smith. Florida Crime Writers. Ed. Steve Glassman. McFarland and Company, 2008.

Awards
Cruel Poetry, Finalist for Edgar Award, Best Paperback Original, Mystery Writers of America, 2008.
Florida Individual Artist Fellowship, September, 1998, Honorable Mention in Literature, "ReBecca."

References

20th-century American novelists
21st-century American novelists
American women novelists
Living people
20th-century American women writers
21st-century American women writers
Year of birth missing (living people)
People from Covington, Kentucky
Novelists from Kentucky
Ohio State University College of Education and Human Ecology alumni
Florida Atlantic University alumni
Florida International University alumni
Kentucky women writers